Musschenbroek's spiny rat (Maxomys musschenbroekii) is a species of rodent in the family Muridae.
It is found only in Indonesia.

References

Maxomys
Mammals described in 1878
Taxonomy articles created by Polbot
Endemic fauna of Indonesia
Rodents of Indonesia